Lopeti Oto (born 2 November 1971) is a Tongan-Japanese former rugby union player. He played as wing. His younger brother Nataniela Oto also had acquired Japanese nationality to play for Japan in the 2007 Rugby World Cup and his other brother, Ofa Topeni, plays for Toyota Industries Shuttles since 2009.

Career
After graduating from Tonga College, Oto went to Daito Bunka University to study abroad and play rugby. While he studied abroad, he contributed to his team's second place in the 1991 All-Japan Rugby University Championship and the victory in the 1994 University Championship. 
Oto was first capped for Japan in the 1992 ARFU Asian Rugby Championship match against Hong Kong, at Seoul, on 26 September 1992. He was also in the 1995 Rugby World Cup squad, earning 8 caps. 
In 1996, after graduating, Oto joined Toyota Motors, with which he won in 1998 the All-Japan Rugby Company Championship. While he is 175 cm high and weights 100 kg, he could run 10 meters in 5 seconds, in a speed similar to the one of a whirlwind.
Oto also contributed to Toyota's victory in the Rugby Company Championship in the 1998-99 season. 
He retired in 2003 season.
Currently, Oto teaches at Kasugaoka High School.

Notes

External links
2019 ALL FOR JAPAN TEAM
Lopeti Oto international stats

1971 births
Living people
Tongan rugby union players
Japanese rugby union players
Rugby union wings
Tongan emigrants to Japan
Naturalized citizens of Japan
Japan international rugby union players
Tongan expatriate rugby union players
Expatriate rugby union players in Japan
Tongan expatriate sportspeople in Japan
Toyota Verblitz players